Super Wings is an animated television series created by Gil Hoon Jung and produced by the company made by himself, FunnyFlux Entertainment, in South Korea, in association with Alpha Group Co., Ltd. from China with production support from the Educational Broadcasting System in South Korea and additional support from KOCCA.

Plot 
The series follows a basic format, in which Jett interacts with other Super Wings at World Airport before being called to a delivery, being informed by Jimbo and given some facts about the location and a bit of the local language. Using this knowledge, he interacts with the kid or kids ordering the packages until they reach a problem, whereupon he calls for help from one or more of the Super Wings (some people ordering the packages are adults in certain episodes). The additional help would aid in solving the problem before they leave with Jett.

The format remained relevant in Season 2, though the interaction segments were dropped. Jimbo also no longer works at World Airport in this season, being replaced by his niece Sky while he takes an around-the-world vacation (though he still makes cameos in the locations Jett makes his deliveries). The assisting format was also altered, as typically more than one Super Wing ends up with Jett at the end of the episode.

Season 3 brings the interaction segment back to the fold, and sees Jimbo return as a maintenance technician. The rest of the format remains in place from Season 2, though the assistance method changes once again. Jett now receives help from a specialized team of Super Wings, rather than from a random selection. The episode count also dropped from 52 to 40.

Major changes came in Season 4, with much of the show now taking place on World Aircraft, a giant plane functioning as a mobile airport (with Jimbo as captain and Sky as communications officer). The kids now actually call the Super Wings to make specialized products (manufactured by Storm, a new character and World Aircraft's chief engineer), to be shipped in metal box like-containers rather than in cardboard boxes in past seasons. Jett now has a regular travel buddy and Rescue Rider talking dragon for deliveries, and they are instead given upgrades by way of a super charge beam rather than receiving help, although other Super Wings and dragons show up randomly in some episodes. The number of episodes remained at 40.

Season 5 is like Season 4, as the Super Wings are still in the World Aircraft (with Jimbo, Sky and Storm in their same positions).  This season, however, the Super Wings have new companions: Super Pets, small creatures resembling Super Wings that can transform into all kinds of things for missions. They also have to face Golden Boy (a golden plane that can transform and use its arms like rockets) who appears regularly in episodes to prevent the Super Wings from trying to carry out their missions. Unlike in Season 4, Jett no longer calls Super Charge mode but rather Super Helps, a team made up of a Super Wing and its corresponding Super Pet.

Season 6 brings a new format of missions for the Super Wings squad: The World Guardians, Super Pets are not used in missions (they are now in the control room with Sky  and Storm, while Jimbo is absent) and the Super Charge mode is replaced by the Super Balls and Super Dragons, a new type of item that contain elemental powers like wind, fire, polar, water, animal or lightning, and kids which Jett brings a pack can also join them, calling themselves the World Guardians Buddies. One of the major novelties of this season is the World Aircraft transforming into a giant robot called "World Robot", used when situations or problems may have become too complicated. Golden Boy is still around this season and has a new accomplice called Golden Wheels. Furthermore, they're not shy about making things worse on the World Guardians missions.

Development 
In 2010, Super Wings arose out of Little Airplane Wissie which took place in Ciel City. The main character of this series, Jett, was originally named Wissie. Here, Wissie and his friends are not transforming robots, unlike in the current concept.

Super Wings was announced in September 2013, and had a licensing market debut at that year's MIPJunior in Cannes, France.

Characters

Heroes
His task is to deliver packages to kids around the world. Jett is the fastest aircraft in the world, full of energy and confidence, and is friendly with everyone at the international airport. He likes to fly around the world to help children deliver packages. Whenever difficulty arises, which is often because Jett is naïve or incompetent, he will call his best friend "Super Wings" to help. Jett's original power was solely Jett Speed, though as the show progressed, he became able to adapt to any environment and also gained in competency. In Season 5, Jett has a new little companion: Mini Jett/Jett Pet. At the start of the first two-part episodes of Season 6, he became a Legendary Super Wing and entered the Hall of Fame. 
Dizzy is a pink rescue helicopter with rescue ropes and emergency equipment, but she doesn't look at her Svens as she is very powerful. As long as Jett is in a critical situation and needs help, Dizzy will be dispatched immediately because they are the best partners! In Season 3, she is the leader of the Rescue Riders (formed by herself and her two siblings, Zoey (an ambulance) and Sparky (a fire truck)). In Season 5, Dizzy has a new Super Pet, Mini Dizzy/Dizzy Pet. 
 Donnie (Duōduō; voiced by Soyoung Hong in the Korean version and Colin Critchley in the English version): A male orange and blue plane, which many commonly mistake as yellow, with the specialty to make or repair things with his handy tool kit. He is prone to self-inflicted accidents. Donnie is based upon a Canadair CL-415, but in cartoony version. Donnie is an excellent engineer in Super Hero. He always meets the possibilities of infinity in the best condition. He is a good and trustworthy partner with a powerful toolbox that always helps other Super Wings at critical moments. Although Donnie is smart, he always likes to make things that make people laugh and cry. In Season 3, he becomes the leader of the Build-It Buddies (formed by himself and his two siblings, Remi (a mixing truck) and Scoop (an excavator)). In Season 5, he is followed by his new Super Pet, Mini Donnie/Donnie Pet.
 Jerome (Kùfēi; voiced by Jeon Tae-yeol in the Korean version and Evan Smolin in the English version): A male blue fighter jet based on a McDonnell/Douglas F-18 from the Blue Angels aerobatic team. He believes that some problems Jett faces can be solved with a dance routine, and thinks he can do other Super Wings' missions better than they can. He was written off as a main character in Season 3, becoming the leader of Team Jerome which is formed by himself and his two siblings, Arome and Jerry (two other fighter jets, who did not transform) as a competition stunt team. Despite him being removed from the main cast, the theme song still erroneously still features Jerome's name in the lyrics, while Paul has now been seen in the slot since Season 4. He is absent in Season 5 and Season 6, but will return in Season 7. In Season 7, Jerome is followed by his new Super Pet, Mini Jerome/Jerome Pet.
One of his jobs is to guard the World Airport at night. At times, he helps Jett and others by using his traffic control and detective skills. Paul was originally strict but fun-loving; as the show progressed, however, he loosened up and replaced Jerome as the Super Wings dancing expert. In Season 3, he is the leader of the Police Patrol. In Season 5, Paul has a new Super Pet, Mini Paul/Paul Pet.
He gives  Jett moral advice about some tasks. He also has a trunk full of items collected over time from his younger days as an adventurer, the most prominent being the telephoto transporter, a camera which can change the size of whatever is photographed. Like Jerome, he was written off as a main character in Season 3, but he still makes cameos in subsequent seasons. He is absent in Season 5, but returned in Season 6.
She is the only member of the Super Wings team that loves water and can breathe underwater without diving equipment (up until Chase's introduction and Jett's upgrades in Season 3). In Season 3, she is the leader of the Wild Team. She was absent in Season 5 and Season 6, but will possibly return in Season 7.
His specialty is to talk with various animals in their language. He was written off in Season 3.
He can transform into almost anything in addition to a robot and a plane. He was written off in Season 3.
He has a drill for his nose. He was written off in Season 3.
She is an expert on missions that involve outer space. Astra has a twin brother, Astro, who appeared in Season 3-Season 5. The leader of Galaxy Wings, she is the only Season 2 character to appear in following seasons. Astra is followed by her new Super Pet in Season 5, Mini Astra/Astra Pet.
He joined the Super Wings in "The Bermuda Blunder" after helping rescue Jett from the Bermuda Triangle. He was written off in Season 3.
 Jimbo (Kobo; ; voiced by Um Sang-hyun in the Korean version and J.L. Mount in the English version): The former main traffic controller and the only human working at the World Airport in Season 1. In Season 2, he goes on an around the world vacation while his niece Sky, takes his place as air traffic controller, though he does make cameos in Jett's delivery destinations. In Season 3 he returns, this time as Maintenance Technician, before becoming the Captain Commander of World Aircraft, the new base for the Super Wings in Season 4. He is absent in Season 6 and Season 7, but will possibly return in Season 8.
In Season 4, she is the new communications officer of World Aircraft. She gets around on a hoverboard. Her devices are the same in Season 5. As of Season 6, Sky takes over as the Captain Commander of World Aircraft since Jimbo is absent in that season and the next season.
 Storm: A young boy introduced in Season 4 and the chief engineer of World Aircraft. He gets around with a jetpack. His devices are the same in Season 5.
 Roy (Pippi (Pí pí); voiced by Emma Fusco in the English version): A luggage tug. He is always wanting to fly, like the Super Wings. He often drops some items on the tarmac because he is in such a hurry. He has a twin brother named Ray.
He acts as a father figure towards Donnie. He was written off in Season 3.
 Big Wing (Dà péng; voiced by Jeong Yeong-wung in the Korean version and Conor Hall in the English version): A blue and white jumbo passenger plane with a yellow stripe. He is the biggest member of the Super Wings team. He is the only Super Wings member that does not transform into robot mode. (Note: A large airplane similar to Big Wing appears in the Season Three episode "The Case of the Lost Suitcase") He was written off in Season 4. 
 Neo (Yuán yuán; voiced by Catie Harvey in the English version): A small plane colored yellow and green. Neo works at a factory as she transforms. Neo was absent in Season 4, Season 5 and Season 6.
 Zoey (Xiǎo róu; voiced by Kim Eu-nah in the Korean version and Alisha Liston in the English version): A female pink and white ambulance who is part of the Rescue Riders. She was written off in Season 5.
 Remi (voiced by Bak Sin-hee in the Korean version and Camille Schurer in the English version): A female mixing truck with interchangeable bed parts, who is part of the Build-It Buddies. She and Scoop are Donnie's siblings. She is also a member of the Super Wings Big Team. She was written off in Season 6.
 Scoop (voiced by Nam Doh-hyeong in the Korean version and Brysen Rush in the English version): A male excavator with alternate crane parts, who is part of the Build-It Buddies. He and Remi are Donnie's siblings. He was written off in Season 5.
 Astro (voiced by Tex Hammond in the English version): A male white space plane. He is Astra's twin brother, who is a part of the Galaxy Wings. He was written off in Season 6.
 Rover (voiced by Isaiah Russell-Bailey in the English version): A male white moon rover who is a part of both the Galaxy Wings and the Super Wings Big Team.
 Willie (voiced by Jalen K. Cassell in the English version): A male green intermodal submarine capable of traveling on land. He is part of the Wild Team and the Super Wings Big Team. He was absent in Season 5, but returned in Season 6, and was written off in Season 7.
 Swampy (voiced by Dashiel Berk in the English version): A male green fan boat. He is part of the Wild Team. He was written off in Season 5. 
 Kim (voiced by Jeong Hye-ok in the Korean version and Araceli Prasarttongosoth in the English version): A female police car. She is part of the Police Patrol. She was written off in Season 5.
 Badge (voiced by Um Sang-hyun in the Korean version and Armen Taylor in the English version): A tiltrotor police plane who is part of the Police Patrol. Unlike Paul, he doesn't transform. He is also a member of the Super Wings Big Team. He was written off in Season 6.
 Arome: A female fighter jet who is part of Team Jerome. She is Jerome's sister. Unlike Jerome, she and Jerry didn't transform. She was written off in Season 4. 
 Jerry: Another male fighter jet who is part of Team Jerome. He is Jerome's brother. Unlike Jerome, he and Arome didn't transform. He was written off in Season 4.
 Crystal: A purple female Cat plane who does not belong to a team. She helps people after blizzards and ice storms.
 Bucky: An orange and yellow male Bumblebee plane capable of shrinking who is the Super Wings insect expert. He deals with problems that require being small.
 Sunny: An orange and white female plane, she loves singing and dancing and has a little companion Super Pet named Mini Sunny/Sunny Pet. She was written off in Season 6.
 Leo: A blue flying car. Like Flip in Season 2, he joined the Super Wings when Jimbo offered him the opportunity to join. He has a Super Pet named Mini Leo/Leo Pet. He was written off in Season 6.
 The Super Pets: Also known as Super Minis. The seven Super Pets are the new companions of the Super Wings. They can transform into various objects like a glove, rescue pillow, shield, crasher, holo-rope or speaker. They are cute and playful with the Super Wings. Their names are: Jett Pet, Dizzy Pet, Donnie Pet, Paul Pet, Astra Pet, Sunny Pet and Leo Pet. Leo Pet and Sunny Pet were written off in Season 6.
 Lime: A light blue Super Wings with a chef's hat and a portable kitchen, she's the new cook chef in the Super Wings Team's World Guardians.
 Tony: A blue Train Super Wings with orange stripes, he's the first member of the Super Wings to be a train. He can also transform.
 Tino: A blue-green Super Wings that can transform into a plane and a dinosaur and he can also change size and become a giant Super Wing. Tino is also a Legendary Super Wing.

Villains
 Super Drones: The machines that Neo made are one-time characters. They only appear in the Season 3 episode "Send in the Drones", when they are always up to no good.
 Golden Boy: A golden yellow, male, plane and the antagonistic villain in the series. He always plays tricks on Jett and his friends. Golden Boy got a new sidekick in Season 6 called Golden Wheels. In Season 7, Golden Boy is followed by his Super Pet named Mini Golden Boy/Golden Boy Pet. 
 Mambo: A blue all-terrain vehicle with orange and red flames, he appears for the first time in the  Season 5 episode "Geneva Car Show Chaos", then again in the episode "The Great Desert Dash" where he teams up with Golden Boy. He was written off in Season 6.
 Golden Wheels: A Golden yellow male truck and the second antagonist since Season 6, he's the new sidekick of Golden Boy and they are making more tricks on Jett's missions. Unlike the plane, Golden Wheels didn't transform. He was written off in Season 7, leaving Golden Boy.

Occasional characters
 Ray: Another luggage tug, who looks like Roy because they are twins, he appears during the introduction segment of the episodes "Fiesta! Fiesta!" (Season 1) and "Doubles Trouble" (Season 2), but he doesn't live at World Airport.
 Fred: An orange and white male plane, he appears in the introductory segment of the episodes "Penguin Parade" (Season 1) and "Moscow Metro" (Season 3). Unlike the Super Wings, Fred doesn't transform into a robot.
 Thunder: Thunder and his teammates; Therno and Strato are a stunt team and appear in the Season 3 episode "Abu Dhabi Thunder" where they face Team Jerome.
 Narae: A white and blue plane, he is the mascot of the South Korea National Aviation Museum and appears in the Season 5 episode "Airport Museum Adventure" to help the Super Wings. Narae can also transform.
 Windy: A young human girl who is Storm's little sister, she appeared during the Season 5 episode "Super Pet Sweep Up Surprise". Her "Super Wings Mission" was to keep the Super Pets, but almost failed with one of Golden Boy's plans.
 Xuan Yi: An ocher-colored car that can transform into a robot that appears in the "Super Wings x Nissan Mini Movie", in which he helps Jett and Cici (Season 4, episode "Guangzhou Lightshow")

Teams
In Season 3, Jett receives help from a team of Super Wings instead of just one. Whenever a Super Wings team is selected, his wings symbol changes to that of the assisting team and he gains a new helmet and equipment related to the team (with the exception of Team Jerome and Big Team).
Rescue Riders: Composed of Dizzy, Zoey and Sparky. Specializing in rescue operations, they often help Jett in medical situations, fires and search and rescue. When Jett works with the Rescue Riders, he gains a safety helmet and a backpack loaded with first aid supplies and emergency kits. Zoey was written off in Season 5, leaving Dizzy and Sparky. 
Build-It Buddies: Composed of Donnie, Scoop and Remi. Specializing in construction and repair jobs, they often help Jett in situations where they need to build something. When Jett works with the Build-It Buddies, he gains a hard hat and a backpack loaded with a large assortment of tools. Scoop was written off in Season 5, leaving his two siblings. Remi was written off in Season 6, leaving only Donnie.
Galaxy Wings: Composed of Astra, Astro and Rover. Specializing in problems involving space and technology, they often help Jett in situations involving space travel and advanced technology. When Jett works with the Galaxy Wings, he gains a space helmet and a jetpack containing specialized equipment. This was the only team not to have a member in Season 1. Astro was written off in Season 6, leaving his twin sister Astra and Rover. 
Wild Team: Composed of Mira, Swampy and Willie. Specializing in missions on water and in the wild, they often help Jett in situations involving underwater travel or swamp treks. When Jett works with the Wild Team, he gains a set of diving masks and a pair of turboprops on his wings. Swampy was written off in Season 5, leaving Willie and possibly Mira if she returns in Season 7. Willie re-appeared once in Season 6 and was written off in Season 7, leaving only Mira if she returns.
Police Patrol: Composed of Paul, Kim and Badge. Specializing in detective works and crowd control, they often help Jett in situations involving public masses and lost objects. When Jett works with the Police Patrol, he gains a safety helmet and a backpack loaded with assorted equipment. Kim was written off in Season 5, leaving Paul and Badge. Badge was written off in Season 6, leaving only Paul.
Big Team: Composed of Sparky, Remi, Rover, Willie and Badge. Specializing in many missions and many problems, they help Jett in situations that involve stuck people. Remi and Badge were written off in Season 6, leaving Sparky, Rover and Willie. Willie was absent in Season 5, but returned in Season 6 and was written off in Season 7, leaving Sparky and Rover. 
Team Jerome: Composed of Jerome, Jerry and Arome. Unlike the other Super Wings teams, Team Jerome is a specialized stunt team, often seen at airshows. Jerry and Arome was written off in Season 4, leaving only Jerome. Jerome was absent in Season 5 and Season 6, but will return in Season 7.

Episodes

Release

Distribution 
Alpha Animation and Culture held the distribution rights of the series in Mainland China and the rest of Asia, as well as the Middle East. The series was internationally distributed by CJ E&M.

Broadcast 

In South Korea, Super Wings premiered on September 1, 2014, on EBS1. The initial airings on EBS included a segment which celebrated certain children's birthdays during the closing credits. The show was repeated on some of children's interest channels on multichannel platforms in the country since then: Tooniverse, owned by CJ E&M, was one such channel. Season 2 premiered on March 1, 2017, on EBS1.

In China, the series was syndicated, distributed by Alpha to television stations. In Japan, the series was broadcast on BS11. However, the series first aired only as a season 2 and 3 (not including season 1). In the United States, Super Wings also premiered on March 14, 2015, on Sprout (now Universal Kids) and also streamed on Netflix. In Canada, the series premiered on March 3, 2015, on Treehouse TV (owned by Corus), while a French version aired on Ici Radio-Canada Télé's children's block. In the UK and Ireland, Super Wings premiered on Cartoonito and Tiny Pop on February 6, 2017.

In the Arab World, the series was broadcast on Spacetoon on March 7, 2016, while in the Saudi Arabia, the series was broadcast on Basma on 2018. In Singapore, the series debuted on Okto on October 14, 2017. In Hong Kong, the series debuted on Now TV (Hong Kong) on April 25, 2019. In Indonesia, the series was originally broadcast on GTV (formerly Global TV). However, the third season debuted on RTV on April 29, 2019. The fourth season debuted on August 5, 2020. In Israel, the series was broadcast on Hop! Channel.

In Germany, the series was broadcast on Super RTL and KiKA. In Russia, the series was broadcast on Carousel. In Poland, the series was broadcast on TVP ABC. In Ukraine, the series was broadcast on PLUSPLUS. In France, the series was broadcast on TF1, Gulli & Piwi+. In Croatia, the series was broadcast on RTL Kockica. In Thailand, the series was broadcast on Boomerang and Toonie. In the Netherlands, the series was broadcast on RTL Telekids. In Spain, the series was broadcast on Clan. In Angola, the series wad broadcast on ZTV. In Latin America and Brazil, it first aired on Discovery Kids on April 13, 2015.

Awards

Merchandise and other media 
In China, Alpha Animation and Culture (and the Auldey brand which also operates Alpha's toy division) held master/international toy license. In the United States and Canada, the toys were respectively sold by Auldey Toys and Imports Dragon. In South Korea, David Toy owned the Korean toy license. In the United States, Canada and France, Nelvana (itself owned by Corus) owned consumer products rights to Super Wings.

References

External links 
 Super Wings  at Universal Kids
 Super Wings  at Treehouse TV
 Super Wings at Cartoonito UK
 Super Wings at Ten Play
 Super Wings at FunnyFlux Entertainment
 Super Wings  at Alpha Group Co., Ltd.

Aviation fiction
Aviation television series
2010s American animated television series
2015 American television series debuts
American preschool education television series
American children's animated adventure television series
Animated preschool education television series
2010s preschool education television series
Chinese children's animated adventure television series
South Korean children's animated adventure television series
Animated television series about robots
2014 South Korean television series debuts
2010s South Korean animated television series
2010s animated television series
American computer-animated television series
English-language television shows
Television series by Little Airplane Productions
Universal Kids original programming